Rafał Blechacz (born 30 June 1985) is a Polish classical pianist who rose to fame after decisively winning the XV International Chopin Piano Competition in 2005.

Biography 
Blechacz began piano lessons at the age of five, and enrolled in the National Arthur Rubinstein Music School in Bydgoszcz three years later. In May 2007, he graduated from the Feliks Nowowiejski Music Academy in Bydgoszcz with professor Katarzyna Popowa-Zydroń. He won second prize at the Arthur Rubinstein in Memoriam Piano Competition in Bydgoszcz in 2002, second prize at the 4th Hamamatsu International Piano Competition in 2003 (no first prize was awarded), and first prize at the International Piano Competition in Morocco in 2004.

On October 21, 2005, he became the sole recipient of all five first prizes at the 15th International Frederick Chopin Piano Competition in Warsaw, taking First Prize and the polonaise, mazurka, concerto prizes, as well as the Special Prize for Audience Approval. No other pianist has achieved this feat. One of the judges, Piotr Paleczny, said that Blechacz "so outclassed the remaining finalists that no second prize could actually be awarded." Another judge, John O'Conor, called Blechacz "one of the greatest artists I have had a chance to hear in my entire life". Blechacz was the first Pole to win the prize (given every five years) since 1975, when Krystian Zimerman won.

Blechacz signed a contract to record for Deutsche Grammophon on May 29, 2006. In addition to his 2005 debut album from CD Accord, he has released seven albums under Deutsche Grammophon as of March 2022. He recorded with the Warsaw Philharmonic, led by Antoni Wit, for the Chopin Competition in 2005, and with the Concertgebouw, under Jerzy Semkow, for his album of the Chopin piano concertos in 2009. He has also performed with the Russian National Orchestra, the Tonhalle Orchestra, the Berlin Radio Symphony Orchestra, the Philharmonia, the Tokyo Symphony Orchestra, and the Wiener Symphoniker.

In 2014, Blechacz was named the 2014 Gilmore Artist. He is the seventh individual to receive this award, and the second Polish pianist.

Blechacz had been studying philosophy at the Nicolaus Copernicus University in Toruń, and in 2016, took a sabbatical to complete his doctorate. His thesis explored "aspects of the metaphysics and aesthetics of music and, as he reflects, his studies have helped him 'understand both the freedoms and limitations of musical interpretations'". He returned to performing in January 2017.

In March, many of his concerts were cancelled or postponed due to illness.

Discography

References

External links

Rafal Blechacz Performed in Warsaw - NPR 18OCT2006
Rafal Blechacz recorded Chopin's two Piano Concertos - NPR 14FEB2010
Rafał Blechacz at culture.pl

1985 births
Living people
Deutsche Grammophon artists
People from Nakło nad Notecią
Polish classical pianists
Male classical pianists
International Chopin Piano Competition winners
Recipients of the Silver Medal for Merit to Culture – Gloria Artis